A multiple cloning site (MCS), also called a polylinker, is a short segment of DNA which contains many (up to ~20) restriction sites - a standard feature of engineered plasmids. Restriction sites within an MCS are typically unique, occurring only once within a given plasmid. The purpose of an MCS in a plasmid is to allow a piece of DNA to be inserted into that region.

An MCS is found in a variety of vectors, including cloning vectors to increase the number of copies of target DNA, and in expression vectors to create a protein product. In expression vectors, the MCS is located downstream of the promoter.

Creating a multiple cloning site 
In some instances, a vector may not contain an MCS. Rather, an MCS can be added to a vector. The first step is designing complementary oligonucleotide sequences that contain restriction enzyme sites along with additional bases on the end that are complementary to the vector after digesting. Then the oligonucleotide sequences can be annealed and ligated into the digested and purified vector. The digested vector is cut with a restriction enzyme that complements the oligonucleotide insert overhangs. After ligation, transform the vector into bacteria and verify the insert by sequencing. This method can also be used to add new restriction sites to a multiple cloning site.

Uses 
Multiple cloning sites are a feature that allows for the insertion of foreign DNA without disrupting the rest of the plasmid which makes it extremely useful in biotechnology, bioengineering, and molecular genetics. MCS can aid in making transgenic organisms, more commonly known as a genetically modified organism (GMO) using genetic engineering. To take advantage of the MCS in genetic engineering, a gene of interest has to be added to the vector during production when the MCS is cut open. After the MCS is made and ligated it will include the gene of interest and can be amplified to increase gene copy number in a bacterium-host. After the bacterium replicates, the gene of interest can be extracted out of the bacterium. In some instances, an expression vector can be used to create a protein product. After the products are isolated, they have a wide variety of uses such as the production of insulin, the creation of vaccines, production of antibiotics, and creation of gene therapies.

Example
One bacterial plasmid used in genetic engineering as a plasmid cloning vector is pUC18. Its polylinker region is composed of several restriction enzyme recognition sites, that have been engineered into a single cluster (the polylinker). It has restriction sites for various restriction enzymes, including EcoRI, BamHI, and PstI. Another vector used in genetic engineering is pUC19, which is similar to pUC18, but its polylinker region is reversed. E.coli is also commonly used as the bacterial host because of the availability, quick growth rate, and versatility. An example of a plasmid cloning vector which modifies the inserted protein is pFUSE-Fc plasmid.

In order to genetically engineer insulin, the first step is to cut the MCS in the plasmid being used. Once the MCS is cut, the gene for human insulin can be added making the plasmid genetically modified. After that, the genetically modified plasmid is put into the bacterial host and allowed to divide. To make the large supply that is demanded, the host cells are put into a large fermentation tank that is an optimal environment for the host. The process is finished by filtering out the insulin from the host. Purification can then take place so the insulin can be packaged and distributed to individuals with diabetes.

References

Genetics techniques